The J/27 is a keelboat built by J/Boats. It is both a weekend cruiser and a One-Design racing class with strict class rules. Designed with a low & heavy keel with a generous sail area, the boat gives good handling in both light and strong winds, though struggles in moderate winds.

Design 

The J/27 is a Fractional rigged sloop designed by Rod Johnstone and built by Tillotson Pearson, Inc. between 1983 and 1992. 211 boats were built in total before being replaced by the J/80.

A large cockpit and open decks allows crew to move around easily and the Fractional rig means that sail costs are kept down.

The boat comes with a galley with a standard water capacity of 5 gallons and 4 bunks. The boat has an outboard engine placed on the transom (port side).

Other Specifications 

I: 
ISP: 
J: 
P: 
E: 
SPL: 
Displacement to length ratio (Disp/L)= 139.
Sail Area to displacement ratio (SA/Dspl)= 24.

See also 
 J/22
 J/24
 J/32

Notes

External links

 J-Boat Website

Keelboats
1980s sailboat type designs
Sailboat type designs by Rod Johnstone
Sailboat types built by J/Boats